Orthotetida is an order of brachiopods containing the families:

 Suborder Orthotetidina
 Superfamily Orthotetoidea
 Family Orthotetidae
 Family Pulsiidae
 Family Orthotetellidae
 Family Derbyiidae
 Family Meekellidae
 Family Schuchertellidae
 Superfamily Chilidiopsoidea
 Family Chilidiopsidae
 Family Areostrophiidae
 Suborder Triplesiidina
 Superfamily Triplesioidea
 Family Triplesiidae

References

Strophomenata